Italy sent a delegation to compete at the 1964 Summer Paralympics in Tokyo, Japan.  Its athletes finished third in the gold and overall medal count.

The wrong reports

Since at the dawn of the Paralympic Games there was no precision in reporting the results of the competitions, the Israeli athlete Michal Escapa was indicated with the Italian nationality and without prename (and so she is mentioned in the International Paralympic Committee of the Italian Paralympic Committee web sites) for the reports of the Swimming at the 1964 Summer Paralympics where she won two bronze medals, simply reported as Escapa and not as Michal Escapa. However, as can be seen from a 1968 Israeli newspaper reporting an interview with the athlete, she was the same athlete who had won medals in swimming and table tennis in Tokyo 1964.

Medalists

See also 
 1964 Summer Paralympics
 Italy at the 1964 Summer Olympics

References

External links
 Storia delle Paralimpiadi: Tokyo 1964 

Nations at the 1964 Summer Paralympics
1964
Summer Paralympics